Llancayo is a village in Monmouthshire, south east Wales, United Kingdom.  It is located two miles north of Usk on the B4598 road to Abergavenny, in the community of Gwehelog Fawr.

History and amenities 
Llancayo Mill is situated in fields visible from the road. It was built around 1813 and destroyed by fire by about 1830.  The local story is that the miller left the mill gears engaged when he went to market, and when the wind changed direction the mechanism overheated, igniting the surrounding timber.   A Monmouthshire poet, Myfanwy Haycock, wrote a poem about the now disused windmill.  It has now been fully restored, with working sails, for use as a "luxury retreat".

The River Usk flows close by.

References

External links
 A photo of Llancayo Mill
 Myfanwy Haycock's poem

Villages in Monmouthshire